Rachel Chavkin (born July 20, 1980) is an American stage director best known for directing the musicals Natasha, Pierre, & The Great Comet of 1812 and Hadestown, receiving nominations for a Tony Award for Best Direction of a Musical for both and winning for Hadestown in 2019.

Early life and education
Chavkin was born in Washington, D.C., where her parents were civil rights lawyers. She was raised in the Washington suburb of Silver Spring, Maryland. She is a non-practicing Jew.

She has a BFA from New York University and an MFA from Columbia University.

Career

Chavkin currently holds the position of Artistic Director at The TEAM, and has worked to direct and produce many pieces for The TEAM, including award-winning and internationally touring plays, such as Roosevelvis, Mission Drift, and Architecting.

She directed Three Pianos which ran off-off-Broadway at the Ontological-Hysteric Theater in March 2010 and then at the New York Theatre Workshop in December 2010 to January 2011. She won the 2010 Obie Award, Obie Special Citation for Three Pianos.

Chavkin has worked in collaboration with actor and fellow playwright Taylor Mac across multiple projects, including The Lily’s Revenge, Act 2 (HERE); and with Chris Thorpe, including Confirmation and Status

Chavkin directed Dave Malloy's Natasha, Pierre & The Great Comet of 1812, which ran off-Broadway in 2013–2014. Natasha, Pierre & The Great Comet of 1812 received the 2013 Obie Award, Special Citation. Under her direction, the musical opened on Broadway at the Imperial Theatre on November 14, 2016. At the 71st Tony Awards, the musical received twelve nominations, the highest number for the 2016–17 season, including a nomination for Chavkin for Best Director of a Musical.

She directed The Royale by Marco Ramirez, off-Broadway at Lincoln Center, which opened in March 2016. She was nominated for the 2016 Drama Desk Award for Outstanding Director of a Play for directing The Royale. She received the 2016 Obie Award, Direction, for The Royale.

Chavkin directed the folk opera Hadestown, written by Anaïs Mitchell, which opened officially at the off-Broadway New York Theatre Workshop on May 23, 2016. Following productions in Edmonton and London, Hadestown opened on Broadway in April 2019 at the Walter Kerr Theatre. She went on to win the Tony Award for Best Direction of a Musical. She directed Anything That Gives Off Light at the Edinburgh International Festival in August 2016, in a co-production with The TEAM and The National Theatre of Scotland.

In 2017, Chavkin was presented with the Smithsonian Award for Ingenuity along with Dave Malloy.

In 2018, she directed Lempicka, which premiered on July 20 at the Williamstown Theater Festival.

Chavkin directed the world premiere of Dave Malloy's Moby-Dick, which opened at the American Repertory Theater of Harvard University on December 11, 2019.

On February 22, 2023, it was announced that Chavkin would be directing the Broadway-aimed Gatsby musical, which will premiere in 2024 at American Repertory Theater in Cambridge, Massachusetts.

Directing style
In an article in American Theatre, Diep Tran noted that she has a "diverse slate of work" united with "a distinctively multisensory sensibility.... When she staged Meg Miroshnik's The Fairytale Lives of Russian Girls at Yale Repertory Theatre, she included a live female punk band; her work with the TEAM routinely blends text, video, and pervasive sound design. 'She can squeeze a lot into a small space, and yet it feels epic and sprawling,' said Ars Nova artistic director Jason Eagan."

Personal life 
Chavkin married Jake Heinrichs in 2011.

Awards and nominations

References

External links

Columbia biography page
The TEAM official website

Living people
Place of birth missing (living people)
American theatre directors
Women theatre directors
Obie Award recipients
Tisch School of the Arts alumni
Columbia University School of the Arts alumni
Tony Award winners
1980 births
American Jews